Dennis Gardeck (born August 9, 1994) is an American football linebacker for the Arizona Cardinals of the National Football League (NFL). He played college football at West Virginia State and Sioux Falls, where he was a nominee for the Harlon Hill Trophy and was a finalist for the Cliff Harris Award. He was signed by the Cardinals as an undrafted free agent in 2018. Gardeck attended Crystal Lake South High School in Crystal Lake, Illinois.

Professional career

Gardeck signed with the Arizona Cardinals as an undrafted free agent on April 30, 2018. He made the Cardinals roster as an undrafted rookie, playing in all 16 games primarily on special teams.

In Week 14 of the 2019 season against the Pittsburgh Steelers, Gardeck recovered a fumble forced by teammate Darrell Daniels on punter Jordan Berry during a fake punt attempt in the 23–17 loss. For his play in 2019, he was named a Pro Bowl Alternate as a Special Teamer.

In Week 5 against the New York Jets in 2020, Gardeck recorded his first two career sacks on Joe Flacco during the 30–10 win. In Week 14 against the New York Giants, Gardeck recorded two sacks on Daniel Jones during the 26–7 victory. In Week 15 against the Philadelphia Eagles, Gardeck recorded two sacks on Jalen Hurts during the 33–26 win. On December 25, 2020, Gardeck was placed on injured reserve. He finished the season second on the team with seven sacks.

The Cardinals placed a restricted free agent tender on Gardeck on March 15, 2021. He signed the one-year contract on April 15. He was placed on injured reserve on September 11, 2021. He was activated on October 2, 2021.

On March 14, 2022, Gardeck signed a three-year contract extension with the Cardinals.

Personal life
Gardeck's brother, Ian, is a former professional baseball player.

References

External links
 Sioux Falls Cougars bio

1994 births
Living people
American football linebackers
Arizona Cardinals players
People from McHenry County, Illinois
Players of American football from Illinois
Sioux Falls Cougars football players
Sportspeople from the Chicago metropolitan area
Ed Block Courage Award recipients